Misheh Deh-e Olya (also Romanized as Mīsheh Deh-e ‘Olyā; also known as Mīsheh Deh Bālā) is a village in Lahijan-e Sharqi Rural District, Lajan District, Piranshahr County, West Azerbaijan Province, Iran. At the 2006 census, its population was 79, in 11 families.

References 

Populated places in Piranshahr County